Charles Gore may also refer to:

Charles Gore (1853–1932), British Anglican theologian and bishop
Charles Gore (artist) (1729–1807), British artist
Charles Gore (cricketer) (1871–1913), New Zealand cricketer, statistician, and museum curator
Charles Gore (MP) (1711–1768), British landowner and politician
Charles Knox-Gore (1831–1890), Irish Baronet of the Knox-Gore baronets
Charles Stephen Gore (1793–1869), British noble and general